The Presidential Council was created in March 1990 to replace the Politburo as the major policymaking body in the USSR. According to article 127 in the Soviet constitution the job of the presidential council was "to implement the basic thrust of USSR's domestic and foreign policy and ensure the country's security", and to present the president policy alternative on social, economic, foreign and defence problems facing the nation, but it lacked a clear mission and had no policymaking authority, and its members were unable to work as a team. In late 1990, Gorbachev invited White House Chief of Staff John H. Sununu to Moscow to advice him on organising the presidential support staff. It was abolished on 26 December 1990. Only the writer Valentin Rasputin was a non-party member.

The members were as follows:

Government of the Soviet Union
1991 disestablishments in the Soviet Union
1990 establishments in the Soviet Union
Perestroika